Government Polytechnic, Korba is a Government-run technical institute located in Korba, Chhattisgarh, India. Established in 1987, it one of the oldest polytechnic in Chhattisgarh (erstwhile Madhya Pradesh). It was established by Government of Madhya Pradesh and was affiliated to Pandit Ravishankar Shukla University, Raipur. Since 2005, it is affiliated to Chhattisgarh Swami Vivekanand Technical University, Bhilai. It offers Diploma in Engineering in various disciplines approved by All India Council for Technical Education.

Academics
It offers Diploma in Engineering in various fields.

References

Engineering colleges in Chhattisgarh
Korba, Chhattisgarh
Educational institutions established in 1987
1987 establishments in Madhya Pradesh